Tasman Global Access (TGA) is a 2,288 km fibre-optic submarine communications cable that entered service in 2017, linking Australia and New Zealand. TGA consists of two fibre pairs and has a total design capacity of 20 terabits per second.

See also
 Other Australian international submarine cables (and year of first service):
 Australia Singapore Cable (2018)
 Hawaiki Nui Cable (2018)
 Pipe Pacific Cable (2009)
 Telstra Endeavour (2008)
 Australia–Japan Cable (2001)
 Southern Cross Cable (2000)
 SEA-ME-WE 3 (2000, Australian portion in service earlier)
 JASURAUS (1997)
 PacRimWest (1995)

References

Submarine communications cables in the Pacific Ocean
Australia–New Zealand relations
2017 establishments in Australia
2017 establishments in New Zealand